Mein Lieber Katrina is a 1914 American silent comedy short starring Charlotte Burton, George Field, Ida Lewis and John Steppling.

Cast
 George Field as Heine, restaurant proprietor
 John Steppling as Hicks, the village constable
 Ida Lewis as Katrina
 Charlotte Burton as The Dishwasher

External links

1914 films
1914 comedy films
Silent American comedy films
American silent short films
American black-and-white films
1914 short films
American comedy short films
1910s American films